Discoderella is a genus of beetles in the family Buprestidae, containing the following species:

 Discoderella dilaticollis Bellamy, 1988
 Discoderella stevensoni (Thery, 1932)

References

Buprestidae genera